Mianeh-ye Jenjan (also Romanized as Mīāneh-ye Jenjān; also known as Mīāneh) is a village in Fahlian Rural District, in the Central District of Mamasani County, Fars Province, Iran. At the 2006 census, its population was 144, in 34 families.

References 

Populated places in Mamasani County